Marwahin (Marwāḩīn) is a town in Lebanon, on its border with Israel. A group of 23 residents, mostly children, were killed by Israel during the  2006 Lebanon War while attempting to evacuate under Israeli orders.

Name
According to E. H. Palmer, the name  comes either  from: [..]  "a place where the wind blows, effacing the traces of dwellings,' or from [..] "a fan".

History
In 1875, Victor Guérin found here many ruins, with some Bedouin camping among the ruins.

In 1881, the PEF's Survey of Western Palestine (SWP)  found here: "Traces of ruins, one tomb with fourteen loculi, three cisterns, and one olive-press."

Modern period
The people of the village are Sunni Muslims.

On 31 March 1993 an Israeli tank was destroyed and its crew killed in an ambush near Marwahin. The DFLP claimed responsibility for the attack. Two weeks later, 13 April, a further three Israeli soldiers were killed in the security zone.

During the 2006 Lebanon War, Marwahin was the site of ground exchanges between Israel and Hezbollah, which ended with a massacre of civilians. According to Human Rights Watch, the villagers of Marwahin reported that there had been some Hezbollah fighters and weapons in their village.

Lebanese civilian refugees from the town were first ordered by Israeli forces to flee the area, and given two hours to do so. They were then slaughtered in a convoy hit by an Israeli helicopter crew when they proceeded to obey the order to evacuate. Only two persons survived the massacre, by pretending to be dead. According to Human Rights Watch, no weapons were found in the vehicles destroyed by the Israeli attacks and personnel who tried to recover the victims' bodies were attacked. Human Rights Watch cited it as one of nine cases where they had ascertained that Israeli warplanes targeted civilian vehicles on roads during the 2006 hostilities. It stated that 23 civilians from this one village were killed by the Israeli strike, including 14 children and 7 women. The study reveals that the prime cause for the high Lebanese civilian death toll was Israel’s repeated failure to abide by a fundamental obligation of war rules.

See also
Belat temple

References

Bibliography

External links
Survey of Western Palestine, Map 3:  IAA, Wikimedia commons 
Merouahine, Localiban
    
Populated places in the Israeli security zone 1985–2000
Populated places in Tyre District
Sunni Muslim communities in Lebanon